The 1954 International cricket season was from April 1951 to August 1951.

Season overview

June

South Africa in England

Scotland in Ireland

August

England in Netherlands

September

South Africa in Netherlands

References

1951 in cricket